Tumor alopecia is the hair loss in the immediate vicinity of either benign or malignant tumors of the scalp.

See also
Cicatricial alopecia
 List of cutaneous conditions

References

Conditions of the skin appendages